San Dimas High School is a secondary school located in San Dimas, California, in the United States. It is part of the Bonita Unified School District. Most of the students come from Lone Hill Middle School which shares the same city block as the High School. The school has a student body of 1,296 and an API score of 839. The mascot is the Saint and was originally depicted as a knight slaying a dragon. The school is also referred to by students as SD. Its colors are royal blue and bright gold.

History
San Dimas High School was opened in 1970 to serve the growing population of San Dimas, California. A distinctive bell tower was built on campus in 1980 to create an icon for the main quad. The bell tower houses the bell from the original San Dimas Elementary School and is rung each time a team wins a CIF Championship. The bell tower was refurbished in 2011 with a wider base to support the structure. Each year the school plays their cross town rivals, Bonita High School, in the Smudge Pot Bowl football game. The winner of the game takes home a silver smudge pot reminiscent of the area's citrus growing history.

Honors
San Dimas High School has been named a California Distinguished School three times, most recently in 2009. It has been on Newsweek Magazine's list of "America's Best High Schools," most recently in 2010. The Animation Program received a Golden Bell Award from the California School Boards Association in 2007.

Advanced Placement courses
San Dimas High School offers 16 Advanced Placement (AP) Courses along with a variety of honors and accelerated courses:

AP Biology
AP Calculus AB
AP Calculus BC
AP Chemistry
AP English Language
AP English Literature
AP Environmental Science
AP French Language
AP Music Theory
AP Psychology
AP Physics
AP Spanish Language
AP Statistics
AP Studio Art
AP United States Government
AP United States History
AP World History

Athletics
San Dimas High School plays in the Valle Vista League. San Dimas Saint Football won the CIF Southern Section Division Mid-Valley (XI)(Section) Champion for 2009 by defeating Monrovia High School 12–7 at Citrus College on December 12, 2009. San Dimas Saint Baseball won the CIF Southern Section Division Champion for 2009 on June 5, 2009 at Angel Stadium.

In popular culture 
The title characters of the 1989 film Bill & Ted's Excellent Adventure attend San Dimas High School. A history project to be completed in front of the whole school drives the plot of the film. A line from another student's presentation, "San Dimas High School Football Rules!" has entered popular culture, such as the title of a song from the 1999 album Blue Skies, Broken Hearts...Next 12 Exits by The Ataris.

Notable alumni
Jamie Dantzscher, an Olympic Gymnast in the 2000 Summer Olympics in Sydney for the U.S. Olympic Team.
D. J. Hackett, a professional football wide receiver played for the Seattle Seahawks and Carolina Panthers.
Justin Hoyt, the founder of the musical group Seven Layer Piano Cakes.
Chris Pettit, professional baseball player, Los Angeles Dodgers.

References

External links
 San Dimas High School Website
 Bonita Unified School District

High schools in Los Angeles County, California
Public high schools in California
San Dimas, California
Valle Vista League
Educational institutions established in 1970
1970 establishments in California